St Luke's Church is a Grade I listed parish church in the Church of England in Upper Broughton.

History

It was built in the 12th century. It was restored in 1855 by S. S. Teulon.

It is in a joint parish with two other churches of the same dedication:
St Luke's Church, Hickling
St Luke's Church, Kinoulton

Memorials

Memorials include:
John Brett, 1788 
Elizabeth, wife of John Brett, 1823 signed Pratt, Nottingham

Organ

A specification of the organ can be found on the National Pipe Organ Register.

References

Church of England church buildings in Nottinghamshire
Grade I listed churches in Nottinghamshire
Rushcliffe